Not Richard, But Dick is the seventh studio album by the Dead Milkmen, released in 1993 via Hollywood Records. Like Soul Rotation, the album was a commercial disappointment. After being out of print for years, Hollywood Records released the album for digital download on April 2, 2013.

Production
The album was produced by Jon Lupfer and the band.

Critical reception
Trouser Press wrote that "the simplified Not Richard, but Dick favors down-the-hatch indie-rock, which suits the Milkmen fine but doesn’t make for as entertaining an experience." The Philadelphia Inquirer wrote that "the band expresses the discontent of today's teens and twentysomethings with a vividness rarely summoned by even conscientiously 'righteous' rockers." The Tampa Bay Times thought that "the Milkmen have always had problems making their punkish songs live up to the great titles ... on Not Richard, But Dick they again weigh in with some classic bits of satire and fall short on a few other occasions." The Scripps Howard News Service deemed the album "a goofy palate of cultural references sure to prompt laughter and groans."

Track listing 

 "Leggo My Ego" - 2:21
 "I Dream of Jesus" - 3:47
 "Jason's Head" - 3:08
 "Not Crazy" - 2:35
 "Let's Get the Baby High" - 3:03
 "Little Volcano" - 2:26
 "Nobody Falls Like" - 1:50
 "I Started to Hate You" - 3:17
 "The Infant of Prague Customized My Van" - 1:54
 "The Woman Who Was Also a Mongoose" - 3:35

References 

1993 albums
The Dead Milkmen albums